These are the Billboard magazine number-one albums of 1979, per the Billboard 200.

Chart history

See also
1979 in music
List of number-one albums (United States)

References

1979
1979 record charts